There are many rugby clubs in Sheffield.

Rugby league
Sheffield Eagles - in National League 1
Sheffield Forgers
Sheffield Hillsborough Hawks

Rugby union
Sheffield Abbeydale RUFC
Sheffield Hallamshire RUFC
Sheffield Oaks RUFC
Sheffield Tigers RUFC

Rugby